Guyra railway station is a heritage-listed former railway station and now machinery museum on the Main Northern railway line at Guyra, Armidale Regional Council, New South Wales, Australia. The property was added to the New South Wales State Heritage Register on 2 April 1999.

History 

Guyra station opened on 19 August 1884. The line through Guyra closed in 1989.

The station complex now houses the Guyra Antique Machinery Museum, housing historical railway objects, antique machinery and police memorabilia. The complex received $28,000 in state government funding for preservation works in 2017.

Description 

The station complex includes a type 4 standard roadside third-class brick station building with a brick-faced platform (completed in 1884), a type 3 timber skillion roofed signal box (completed in 1918) and a type 3 60' x 16' corrugated iron goods shed (including office) designed as a side shed with awning (completed in 1884). Jib crane No. 429 remains on the station platform.

Heritage listing 
Guyra station group is part of a group of mid-Victorian stations built on the main north line between Tamworth and the border that represent the most intact group of buildings in the State from this period. They are all excellent examples and form an important group demonstrating the various size and form of structures used at varying sites. The group at Guyra are a good example in their own right and of high significance.

Guyra railway station was listed on the New South Wales State Heritage Register on 2 April 1999 having satisfied the following criteria.

The place possesses uncommon, rare or endangered aspects of the cultural or natural history of New South Wales.

This item is assessed as historically rare. This item is assessed as arch. rare. This item is assessed as socially rare.

See also

References

Bibliography

Attribution

External links

New South Wales State Heritage Register
Disused regional railway stations in New South Wales
Museums in New South Wales
Articles incorporating text from the New South Wales State Heritage Register
Main North railway line, New South Wales